Krste Petkov Misirkov (18 November 1874 – 26 July 1926) was a philologist, journalist, historian and ethnographer from the region of Macedonia.

In the period between 1903 and 1905, he published a book and a scientific magazine in which he affirmed the existence of a Macedonian national identity separate from other Balkan nations, and attempted to codify a standard Macedonian language based on the central Western Macedonian dialects. A survey conducted in the Republic of Macedonia (now North Macedonia) found Misirkov to be "the most significant Macedonian of the 20th century". For his efforts to codify a standard Macedonian language, he is often considered "the founder of the modern Macedonian literary language". 

On the other hand, he was one of the founders of the pro-Bulgarian Secret Macedonian-Adrianople Circle established in 1900 in St. Petersburg. In 1905 he began publishing predominantly articles, written from a Bulgarian nationalist perspective in the IMARO-affiliated press. In his diary written during the Balkan Wars, he advocated Greater Bulgarian views. During the First World War, he became a member of the local parliament in Bessarabia as a representative of the Bulgarian minority there. Misirkov reverted to Macedonian nationalism for a period in 1919. During the 1920s his views changed again, and he encouraged the Macedonian Slavs to adopt a Bulgarian national identity. Misirkov died in 1926 and was buried in the Sofia Central Cemetery with the financial support from the Ministry of Education, as an honoured Bulgarian educator.

Because Misirkov expressed conflicting views about the national identity of the Macedonian Slavs at different points in his life, his national affiliation and legacy remains a matter of dispute between Bulgaria and North Macedonia. While Misirkov's work and personality remain highly controversial and disputed, there have been attempts among international scholars to reconcile the conflicting and self-contradictory statements made by Misirkov. According to historian Ivo Banac, Misirkov viewed both himself and the Slavs of Macedonia as Bulgarians, and espoused pan-Bulgarian patriotism in a larger Balkan context. However, in the context of the larger Bulgarian unit/nation, Misirkov sought both cultural and national differentiation from the other Bulgarians and called both himself and the Slavs of Macedonia, Macedonians.

Biography

Early years 
Krste Petkov Misirkov was born on 18 November 1874 in the village of Postol in the Salonica Vilayet of the Ottoman Empire (present-day Greece). He started his elementary education in the local Greek school, where he was studying until the sixth grade elementary school, but the bad financial situation of his family could not support his further education at that point and he left the school. At that period, the Serbian government began to promote efforts to espouse a pro-Serbian Macedonian nationalism and to recruit young people in order to "Serbianize" them. After some period, Misirkov applied and was granted a scholarship by a Serbian association, "The Society of St. Sava".

Misirkov in Serbia 
For a period, Misirkov studied in Serbia, and soon after he realized that the promotion of pro-Serbian ideas and propaganda was the main goal of the education provided by the Society of St. Sava. The politics practiced by the association forced Misirkov and the other Macedonian students to participate in a students protest and revolt against the Society of St. Sava. As a result, Misirkov and other companions moved from Belgrade to Sofia. He then faced a similar situation in Bulgaria, this time being confronted with pro-Bulgarian propaganda. Misirkov again went to Serbia to continue his education, but without any success as he was rejected by the Society of St. Sava, most likely for his part in the protests conducted against it. Since he was willing to get higher education, he was forced, by a chain of events, to enroll in a theological school for teachers. Similar to the Society of St. Sava, this school as well had its own propagandistic goals which resulted in another revolt of the students. As a result of it, the school had ended its programs and the students were sent throughout Serbia. Misirkov was sent to Šabac, where he finished his fourth course of secondary education, but this time in the local gymnasium, which happened to be his last course. In both Serbia and Bulgaria, Misirkov and his friend were treated as Serbs or Bulgarians in order to be accepted in the educational system. After the gymnasium, even though he graduated, Misirkov enrolled in another secondary school for teachers in Belgrade, where he graduated in 1895. During this time, particularly in 1893, Misirkov founded an association of students called "Vardar".

Misirkov in the Russian Empire 
His qualifications obtained in Belgrade were not recognized in Russia. Misirkov had to study from the very beginning in the Seminary at Poltava. In 1897, he was able to enter the Saint Petersburg Imperial University. Here he entered at first in the Bulgarian Students Association and the Secret Macedonian-Adrianople Circle. Misirkov wrote about that part of his life in the article "School and socialism" "– In 1897 I went to Petrograd University and for five years was among the Bulgarian studentship as Bulgarian and member of the Bulgarian Student Society." Misirkov carried out here his first scholarly lecture on the ethnography and history of the Balkan Peninsula before the members of the Russian Imperial Geographical Society.

On November 15, 1900, Misirkov, who was a third year student in the Faculty of History and Philosophy at the time, along with other students in Russia created a students circle in Saint Petersburg. The main objective of the circle was political autonomy of the populations of Macedonia and Thrace, declared by IMRO, and implemented and guaranteed by the Great Powers. In a letter sent to the President of the Supreme Macedonian-Adrianople Committee on 28 November of the same year, the founders of the circle stated that, "there's no Bulgarian who is not interested in the situation and fate of that part of our homeland, which continue to groan under the yoke of the tyrant." At that time, Misirkov considered the Slavic peoples of Macedonia and Thrace as Bulgarian.

Later Misirkov abandoned the university and left for Ottoman Macedonia.

Returning to the Ottoman Macedonia 
Facing financial obstacles to continue his postgraduate education, he accepted the proposal of the Bulgarian Exarchate to be appointed teacher in one of the high schools in Bitola. There he befriended the Russian consul in Bitola. He began to plan opening of local schools and publishing textbooks in Macedonian, but the Ilinden Uprising in 1903 and the assassination of the Russian Consul changed his plans and he soon returned to Russia. In Russia, Misirkov published different articles about the Ilinden Uprising and the justifications and causes as to why the Consul was assassinated. Soon afterwards, he wrote the brochure,  "The Macedonian Matters" and published it in Sofia. This book, was written in the Central Macedonian dialect, and Misirkov attacked in his writings, the Bulgarian Exarchate, the Ilinden Uprising and the Internal Macedonian-Adrianople Revolutionary Organization (IMRO) as Bulgarian creations. As result, he was persecuted by IMRO, and it is believed that its members destroyed a sizable amount of copies of his book. Furthermore, he recounts that Dame Gruev, Gotse Delchev, Boris Sarafov and other IMRO members were persecuted by Bulgarian and Ottoman governmental officials as they were considered by the officials as anti-Bulgarian separatists and/or Macedonian nationalists and as a result, had to flee from the region.

Again in the Russian Empire 

In 1905, he left Saint Petersburg for Berdiansk. There, he resumed publication of the journal "Vardar"  and was given a post as assistant master in a grammar school. In many of his next articles after 1905, Misirkov espoused pro-Bulgarian views and even categorically renounced the point of his book "The Macedonian Matters", although this behavior might have been caused by many threats made towards him warning him to stop fighting for Macedonian separatism from Bulgaria. On 18 April 1907, Misirkov began to cooperate with the Sofia magazine "Macedonian-Adrianople Review", edited by Nikola Naumov, which was de facto organ of the IMRO. On 24 April 1909, in Odessa, Misirkov printed his work about the South Slavic epic legends on Krali Marko.  On 1 October 1909, he printed the article, "The foundations of a Serbian-Bulgarian rapprochement" in the magazine, "Bulgarian Collection", edited by Bulgarian diplomats and officials in St. Petersburg. During this period, a Slavic Festival was held in Sofia in 1910 with Misirkov invited to attend as its guest of honor. In 1910–1911, he translated the book of the Bulgarian geographer Prof. Atanas Ishirkov, "Bulgaria" from Bulgarian to Russian.

When the First Balkan War had begun, Misirkov went to Macedonia as a Russian war correspondent. In Macedonia, he could follow the military operations of the Bulgarian Army. Misirkov published some articles in the Russian press demanding that the Ottomans should be driven out of Macedonia. In 1913 after the outbreak of the Second Balkan War, Misirkov went back to Russia, where he worked as a teacher in the Bulgarian language schools in Odessa.  Some period of time later, he was appointed teacher of the Bulgarian language school in Chișinău. While working as a teacher in Chișinău, Misirkov sent а letter to the Bulgarian academic Aleksandar Teodorov-Balan with a request to be assigned as a professor at Sofia University. That request clearly indicates his self-identification at that time "– As a Bulgarian, I would willingly return to Bulgaria, if there is a need of a scientific research of the fate of the Bulgarian lands, especially Macedonia..." A shorter letter with similar content was sent to another professor at Sofia University – Vasil Zlatarski with the request to be assigned as a chosen at the newly established department for history of Macedonia and the other western Bulgarian lands.

At that point, Misirkov made contacts with the Macedonian Scientific and Literary Society, which started publishing the journal, "Makedonski glas" ("The Voice of Macedonia") in Russian. Misirkov was publishing in this magazine for some period under the pseudonym "K. Pelski". The journal mostly wrote about happenings in the Macedonian community in Russia as well as issues surrounding the Macedonian people as a whole. In the "Voice of Macedonia", Misirkov defended and wrote about Macedonian ideals which, according to him, were in contrast with Bulgarian ideals and the general Bulgarian populace.

After the outbreak of the First World War in 1914, Bessarabia became a democratic republic, and he was elected a member of the local parliament Sfatul Țării as a representative of the Bulgarian minority. At the same time, Misirkov worked as a secretary in the Bulgarian educational commission in Bessarabia. In March 1918, unification between Bessarabia and Romania was declared. On 21 May 1918, Misirkov openеd a Bulgarian language course in Bolhrad. Misirkov proceeded to take a clandestine trip to Bulgaria in order to procure textbooks for the students, but after his return in November, he was arrested by the Kingdom of Romania authorities, still at war with Bulgaria and was extradited to Bulgaria.

Last years in Bulgaria 
After being expelled by the Romanian authorities, Misirkov returned to Sofia at the end of 1918, where he spent one year as a head of the Historical Department of the National Museum of Ethnography. He proceeded to work as a teacher and director of the high schools in Karlovo and Koprivshtitsa. During this period (but before 1923), the Internal Macedonian Revolutionary Organization (IMRO) marked Misirkov as harmful to its cause and supposedly considering his assassination, but reconsidered after he met with a representative of the organization. He also resumed his journalistic activity and published many articles on the Macedonian Question in the Bulgarian press. Misirkov died in 1926 and was buried in the graveyards in Sofia with the financial support of 5000 levs from the Ministry of Education, as an honoured educator.

Works
In his life, Misirkov wrote one book, one diary, published one issue of a magazine and wrote more than thirty articles. His book "On the Macedonian Matters" was published in Sofia in 1903. The magazine was called "Vardar" and was published in 1905 in Odessa, Russian Empire. The articles that Misirkov wrote have been published in different newspapers and they were focused on different topics. The book, magazine and a number of his article were written in the Central Macedonian dialects, which are basis of Modern Macedonian.

"On the Macedonian Matters"

One of the most important works of Misirkov is the Macedonian book On the Macedonian Matters (Orig: За македонцките работи) published in 1903 in Sofia, in which he laid down the principles of modern Macedonian. This book was written in a Macedonian dialects from the area between Prilep and Bitola. It argued in favor of national separation, the establishment of autonomous national institutions within the Ottoman empire, and the standardization of a distinct Macedonian language. Misirkov attacked both the Bulgarian Exarchate and the Internal Macedonian-Adrianople Revolutionary Organization (IMARO) as agents of the Bulgarian interests in Macedonia. According to this book and Misirkov himself, the Macedonian literary language should be based on dialects from the central part of Macedonia, which were used in the book itself. Furthermore, Misirkov appealed to the Ottoman authorities for eventual recognition of a separate Macedonian nation. During this period, there was no independent Macedonian state, and most of the Macedonian Slavs called themselves Bulgarians as a result of Ottoman religious classifications classifying most Slavic Christians as aligning with the Bulgarian Exarchate, but it should be created, when the necessary historical circumstances would arise.

"Vardar" magazine 
Besides On Macedonian Matters, Misirkov is author of the first scientific magazine in Macedonian. The magazine Vardar was published in 1905 in Odessa, Russian Empire. The magazine was published only once, because of the financial problems that Misirkov had been facing with at that time. "Vardar" has been published in Macedonian, and the orthography that has been used is almost same as the orthography of standard Macedonian. The magazine was meant to include several different scientific disciplines, mostly concerned with Macedonia.

Articles 

During his life, Misirkov published many articles for different newspapers and magazines. The articles deal with Macedonia, Macedonian culture, ethnology, politics and nation on one hand and with the Bulgarian nation, politics and ethnography on the other. Misirkov published his articles in Macedonian, Russian and Bulgarian and he published them either in Russia or in Bulgaria. Most of the articles were signed by his birth name, but there are articles that are signed with his pseudonym K. Pelski.

Diary 
In 2006, a handwritten diary by Misirkov written during his stay in Russia in 1913 was discovered. It was declared authentic by Bulgarian and Macedonian experts and was published in 2008. The content of the diary clearly shows that at the time, Misirkov was a Bulgarian nationalist. It has given rise to new public discussion over Misirkov's stances on Bulgarian and Macedonian ethnicity. The manuscript, includes 381 pages written in Russian language. Misirkov wrote it in Kotovsk's nearby village of Klimentove, where he lived and worked at the time. It contains also articles and excerpts from the Russian press of that time.

Dialectology and ethnography 
In several publications, Misirkov made an attempt to determine the border between the Serbo-Croatian and Bulgarian language, including in the Bulgarian dialect area, nearly all of Torlakian and Macedonian dialects. Misirkov pointed there, that the population in Pomoravlje is autochthonous and Bulgarian by origin, excluding any later migrations during the Ottoman rule from Bulgaria.
According to Krste Misirkov, Krali Marko epic songs in Serbia, the so-called Bugarstici are a result from Bulgarian musical influence over the Serbian folk music.

Controversies about Misirkov's ethnicity and views
During the second half of the 19th century and the beginning of the 20th century, the idea of a separate Macedonian ethnicity was as of yet promoted  by small circles of intellectuals. Then, most of the Slavic people in Macedonia considered themselves Bulgarian, in line with Ottoman classification of Bulgarian Millet, and Macedonian separatist ideas failed to gain wide popular support. At different points in his life, Misirkov expressed conflicting statements about the ethnicity of the Slavs living in Macedonia, including his own ethnicity. According to Ivo Banac, Misirkov viewed himself and the Slavs of Macedonia as Bulgarians, and espoused pan-Bulgarian patriotism, but in the context of the larger Bulgarian nation, Misirkov sought cultural and national differentiation, separating the Macedonians.

View of Misirkov in Bulgaria
In Bulgaria, Misirkov is regarded as a controversial educator with scientific contribution to Bulgarian dialectology and ethnography. He graduated from the Belgrade University as a student of Prof. Stojan Novaković and was influenced by his ideas. At that time, Novaković was a prominent proponent of the Macedonism, thereby promoting Serbian interests in the region of Macedonia. Afterwards Misirkov met several times with him and Novaković's diplomatic activity in St. Petersburg played significant role for the foundation of the Macedonian Scientific and Literary Society. However, after 1906 Misirkov rejected these ideas, opposing the Serbian theory about the "floating mass" of the "Macedonian Slavs" and even developed a kind of Serbophobia. In this period he became evidently bulgarophile and argued that the Slavic population of Macedonia was not "a formless paste" but a "well baked Bulgarian bread". Later in 1913, in his diary from the Balkan wars, he explicitly identifies himself as Macedonian Bulgarian. In a questionnaire filled by Misirkov as a deputy in Bessarabia, he defined himself simply as a Bulgarian. Bulgarian historians believe that his writings were significantly altered by the post-WWII Yugoslavian Communist regime to support the notion of a "Macedonian nation", distinct from the Bulgarian one. Bulgarians also note that Misirkov worked as a Bulgarian teacher in Russia, was Bulgarian deputy in Bessarabia, chose Bulgarian citizenship, lived in Bulgaria and worked there until his death in 1926. Nevertheless, Bulgarian scholarship points out that despite Misirkov in many cases defending the cause of Bulgarian nationalism, he several times switched from Bulgarian to Macedonian one, and vice versa. According to Bulgarian observers, after the breakup of Yugoslavia, in the Republic of Macedonia polemics have also arisen about the identity of Misirkov.

View of Misirkov in North Macedonia
In North Macedonia, Misirkov is regarded as the most prominent Macedonian publicist, philologist and linguist who set the principles of the standard Macedonian in the early 20th century. In some of his writings he identifies the Macedonians as separate nation and the Macedonian as a separate South Slavic language. Also, Misirkov is the author of the first scientific magazine in Macedonian and because of his contributions to the Macedonian national cause, he is regarded as the greatest Macedonian of the 20th century. In his honor, many books and scientific works have been published and the Institute for Macedonian language "Krste Misirkov" is named after him.

There is a debate about Misirkov's ethnicity in North Macedonia issued by Dr. Rastislav Terzioski, who brought to light memos from Russian archives which clearly stated his pro-Bulgarian positions. Since he was not allowed to live and work in Macedonia by the Yugoslav authorities, he remained in Bulgaria. Regarding Misirkov's signature under the phrase "Macedonian Bulgarian", the Macedonian historians and linguists argue that it means nothing but a Macedonian person with a Bulgarian citizenship, in a political sense, or just a Macedonian person living in Bulgaria. However, the fact is that Misirkov gained Bulgarian citizenship after World War I (1915–1918) and has declared as Bulgarian Macedonian in 1913, which is against the claims of the Macedonian historians and linguists. On the other hand according to PhD Vlado Popovski, Misirkov's usage of the term "Macedonian Bulgarian" was only a tactic as a consequence of the Balkan wars and the Bucharest Agreement, he believed that when already it isn't allowed Macedonia to be a separate state than it is better for it to remain whole and be given to one state than to be divided. In that sense he favors Bulgaria because of the historical and cultural closeness. In 1914 and many times after that, he repeated his views about the Macedonian national existence.

See also 
 History of the Macedonian language
 Institute for Macedonian language "Krste Misirkov"
 Macedonian nationalism
 Macedonian studies

Notes

External links

Works
 Krste Misirkov – Misirkov's work on the Macedonian Wikisource. Complete text of his book, magazine and articles.
 Magazine "Vardar" on Wikisource. 
 "On Macedonian matters" – complete text on Wikisource. 
 "On Macedonian matters" – scan of the original book. 
 "On Macedonian Matters" – complete text. 
 Project: Krste Misirkov – on line interactive site about Misirkov's life and work. 
 "On Macedonian Matters" – complete text. 
 Misirkov's diary – downloadable link. 

General
Biography of Krste Misirkov 
"Krste Misirkov also on the Bulgarian matters in Macedonia" by Veselin Trajkov 
Signature of Krste Misirkov in his diary.
 A letter by Kole Nedelkovski to Sergej Misirkov regarding Krste Misirkov and his work.

1874 births
1926 deaths
People from Pella
People from Salonica vilayet
Bulgarians from Aegean Macedonia
Moldovan MPs 1917–1918
Bulgarian educators
Bulgarian writers
Macedonian writers
Bulgarian philologists
Early Macedonists
Slavists
Bulgarian expatriates in Russia
Bulgarian expatriates in Moldova
People extradited to Bulgaria
University of Belgrade Faculty of Philosophy alumni
Bulgarian people of the Balkan Wars
War correspondents of the Balkan Wars
Burials at Central Sofia Cemetery
Macedonian Scientific and Literary Society
Writers from the Ottoman Empire